Pressure altitude is the altitude in the International Standard Atmosphere (ISA) with the same atmospheric pressure as that of the part of the atmosphere in question.

The National Oceanic and Atmospheric Administration (NOAA) published the following formula for directly converting atmospheric pressure in millibars to pressure altitude in feet:

It indicates altitude obtained when an altimeter is set to an agreed baseline pressure under certain circumstances in which the aircraft’s altimeter would be unable to give a useful altitude readout. Examples would be landing at a high altitude or near sea level under conditions of exceptionally high air pressure. This setting is equivalent to the atmospheric pressure at mean sea level (MSL) in the ISA. Pressure altitude is primarily used in aircraft-performance calculations and in high-altitude flight (i.e., above the transition altitude).

Inverse equation 
Solving the equation for the pressure gives

where  are meter and hPa hecto-Pascal. This may be interpreted as the lowest terms of the Taylor expansion of

QNE 
QNE is an aeronautical code Q code. In other words, it is the pressure altitude at the landing runway threshold.

Most aviation texts for PPL and CPL exams describe a process for finding the pressure altitude (in feet) using the following rule of thumb formula:

Alternatively,

Aircraft Mode “C” transponders report the pressure altitude to air traffic control; corrections for atmospheric pressure variations are applied by the recipient of the data.

The relationship between static pressure and pressure altitude is defined in terms of properties of the ISA.

See also
QNH
Flight level
Cabin altitude
Density altitude
Standard conditions for temperature and pressure
Barometric formula

References

Altitudes in aviation